Brandon Peel (born November 1, 1994) is an American professional basketball player for Ovarense Basquetebol of the Liga Portuguesa de Basquetebol (LPB). Peel played college basketball for the Central Connecticut Blue Devils. He entered the 2016 NBA draft but he was not selected in the draft's two rounds.

College career
Peel played college basketball for the Central Connecticut Blue Devils. During his senior year, he averaged 11.7 points, 2.0 assist, 9.1 rebounds and 0.7 steal a game.

Professional career

London Lions (2017–2020)
On September 6, 2017, Peel signed with the London Lions in England for the 2017–18 BBL season. In 33 games, he averaged 13.4 points, 9.3 rebounds, 1.8 assists and 1.1 blocks per game.

On July 16, 2018, Peel re-signed with London Lions on a two-year deal. Peel helped London win BBL Cup and its first regular season championship. He appeared in all 33 games in 2018–19, averaging 12.7 points, 7.6 rebounds and 1.5 assists per game.

Lahti (2020–2021)
On May 20, 2020, Peel signed with Lahti in the Finnish Korisliiga.

Newcastle Eagles (2021–present)
On November 2, 2021, Peel returned to England and signed with the Newcastle Eagles for the 2021–22 BBL season.

Career statistics

College statistics

|-
| style="text-align:left;"| 2012–13
| style="text-align:left;"| Central Connecticut
| 28 || 14 || 19.5 || .505 || 0.00 || .627 || 5.5 || 0.5 || 0.5 || 0.6 || 4.4
|-
| style="text-align:left;"| 2013–14
| style="text-align:left;"| Central Connecticut
| 30 || 24 || 23.0 || .546 || 0.00 || .714 || 6.3 || 0.7 || 0.7 || 2.0 || 7.1
|-
| style="text-align:left;"| 2014–15
| style="text-align:left;"| Central Connecticut
| 31 || 31 || 33.1 || .468 || .364 || .614 || 8.8 || 1.0 || 0.8 || 1.7 || 9.1
|-
| style="text-align:left;"| 2015–16
| style="text-align:left;"| Central Connecticut
| 29 || 29 || 29.7 || .442 || 0.00 || .777 || 9.1 || 2.0 || 0.7 || 1.3 || 11.7
|-
|- class="sortbottom"
| style="text-align:center;" colspan=2| Career
| 118 || 98 || 26.5 || .479 || .267 || .704 || 7.5 || 1.1 || 0.7 || 1.4 || 8.1

BBL statistics

|-
| style="text-align:left;"| 2017–18
| style="text-align:left;"| London Lions
| 33 || 20 || 25.3 || 57.5 || 37.5 || 77.2 || 9.3 || 1.8 || 1.4 || 1.1 || 13.4
|-
| style="text-align:left; background:#afe6ba;"|2018–19†
| style="text-align:left;"| London Lions
| 33 || 33 || 26.5 || 46.4 || 37.5 || 81.0 || 7.6 || 1.5 || 1.0 || 0.9 || 12.7
|-
| style="text-align:left;"| 2019–20
| style="text-align:left;"| London Lions
| 14 || 14 || 26.8 || 48.0 || 31.9 || 70.7 || 8.9 || 1.6 || 0.9 || 0.4 || 13.4
|-
|- class="sortbottom"
| style="text-align:center;" colspan=2| Career
| 80 || 67 || 26.2 || 50.6 || 35.6 || 76.3 || 8.6 || 1.6 || 1.1 || 0.8 || 13.2

Source: Brandon Peel statistics

References

External links
Central Connecticut Blue Devils bio

1994 births
Living people
American expatriate basketball people in the United Kingdom
American men's basketball players
Basketball players from Maryland
Central Connecticut Blue Devils men's basketball players
London Lions (basketball) players
People from Forestville, Maryland
Power forwards (basketball)